GYT may refer to:

 Gimnasia y Tiro, an Argentine football club
 Guyana Time 
 Tochigi TV, a Japanese television station